Kolkata has a Tropical wet-and-dry climate (Köppen climate classification Aw). The annual mean temperature is 26.8 °C (80 °F); monthly mean temperatures range from 15 °C to 30 °C (59 °F to 86 °F). Summers are hot and humid with temperatures in the low 30's and during dry spells the maximum temperatures often exceed 40 °C (104 °F) during May and June. Winter tends to last for only about two and a half months, with seasonal lows dipping to 9 °C – 11 °C (48.2 °F – 51.8 °F) between December and January. The highest recorded temperature is 43.9 °C (111 °F) and the lowest is 5 °C (41 °F). Often during early summer (mid March to mid May), dusty squalls followed by spells of thunderstorm and heavy rains lash the city, bringing relief from the humid heat. These thunderstorms are convective in nature, and is locally known as Kal baisakhi (Nor'westers). 

Rains brought by the Bay of Bengal branch of South-West monsoon lash the city between June and September and supplies the city with most of its annual rainfall of 1,836.5 mm (72.30 inches). The highest rainfall occurs during the monsoon in July and August interchangeably. The city receives 2578 hours of sunshine per annum, with the maximum sunlight occurring in March. Pollution is a major concern in Kolkata, and the Suspended Particulate Matter (SPM) level is high when compared to other major cities of India, leading to regular smog and haze. Severe air pollution in the city has caused rise in pollution-related respiratory ailments such as lung cancer.

Weather Monitoring Stations
Alipore is the major station, which is an international station. But there are also two stations at Dum Dum and Salt Lake.

References

Kolkata
Kolkata
Geography of Kolkata